Jon McIsaac (born c.1983) is a referee in the National Hockey League.

A resident of Truro, Nova Scotia, McIsaac officiated at the 2003 Canada Winter Games held in Bathurst, New Brunswick. At 25, he was officiating professional games in the Central Hockey League.

In August 2012, McIsaac was signed by the  National Hockey League  (NHL), and was appointed to work in the American Hockey League. McIsaac was tagged to make his NHL debut on November 21, 2013, officiating the match-up between the Buffalo Sabres and Philadelphia Flyers.

References

National Hockey League officials
People from Truro, Nova Scotia
Ice hockey people from Nova Scotia
1980s births
Living people